Krapje is a settlement on the right bank of the Mura River in the Municipality of Ljutomer in northeastern Slovenia. It is divided into two distinct hamlets, Zgornje Krapje and Spodnje Krapje (literally, 'upper and lower Krapje'). The area traditionally belonged to the Styria region and is now included in the Mura Statistical Region.

There are two chapels in the settlement, one in Zgornje Krapje and one in Spodnje Krapje. Both are Neo-Gothic chapels, built in the late 19th century.

References

External links
Krapje on Geopedia

Populated places in the Municipality of Ljutomer